Flodaigh Mòr (or Floddaymore) is an uninhabited island in the Outer Hebrides of Scotland.

Geography and geology
Flodaigh Mòr lies east of North Uist, close offshore to Ronay. It contains a large freshwater loch (with its own islets). The eastern headland (Rubha nan Caorach) is almost detached. To the north, skerries almost connect to Floddaybeg.

Notes and references

Uist islands
Uninhabited islands of the Outer Hebrides